The Bridal Veil Falls (French: Voile de la Mariée) is a waterfall on the island of Réunion. Located at about 500 m altitude along the mountainous rampart that separates the cirque Salazie and the plateau forest Bélouve, it falls within the territory of the commune of Salazie on the island of Réunion. A legend related to it: a father crying on the veil of her daughter fell into a deep precipice.

External links
 
 Wondermondo Réunion

Waterfalls of Réunion
Réunion National Park